Grevillea donaldiana is a species of flowering plant in the family Proteaceae and is endemic to the Kimberley region of Western Australia. It is an erect shrub or small tree with elliptic, often slightly curved leaves and three-part, creamy-white flowers.

Description

Taxonomy
Grevillea donaldiana was first formally described in 1988 by Kevin Francis Kenneally in The Western Australian Naturalist from specimens he collected on the banks of the Sale River in 1986. The specific epithet (donaldiana) honours Donald McGillivray.

Distribution and habitat
Grevillea donaldiana is only known from the type location, where it grows in steep, rocky gullies in the Northern Kimberley biogeographic region of Western Australia.

Conservation status
This grevillea is classified as "Priority Two" by the Western Australian Government Department of Biodiversity, Conservation and Attractions, meaning that it is poorly known and from only one or a few locations.

See also
 List of Grevillea species

References

donaldiana
Proteales of Australia
Eudicots of Western Australia
Plants described in 1988